Osinów Dolny  is Poland's westernmost settlement, in the administrative district of Gmina Cedynia, within Gryfino County, West Pomeranian Voivodeship, in north-western Poland, on the border with Germany.

The village has a population of 180. It is the site of a border crossing with Hohenwutzen, on the road connecting the Polish town of Chojna with Bad Freienwalde in Germany.

History

Around 967, the area became part of the emerging Polish state. Following the fragmentation of Poland, it formed part of the Duchy of Greater Poland, and later on, it was also part of Brandenburg, Bohemia (Czechia), Prussia and from 1871 to 1945 also Germany, within which it was administratively located in the Frankfurt Region in the Province of Brandenburg.

There used to be a paper mill of minor regional importance in business here from 1936 to 1939. The paper mill was closed down; today its remaining structures are used as a marketplace.

In the final stages of World War II, in March 1945, it was the site of fights between joint Polish-Soviet forces and the German Wehrmacht. Afterwards, the area became again part of Poland, although with a Soviet-installed communist regime, which then stayed in power until the Fall of Communism in the 1980s. There is a monument to the Polish 1st Independent Mortar Brigade which fought in Osinów Dolny.

Economy
The village enjoys a great deal of business from Germans who cross the border to purchase products and services more cheaply than in Germany. When the border crossing was opened in 1993, thousands of Germans thronged the village in search of inexpensive goods and to fill up their automobile tanks, taking advantage of the cheaper fuel rates. In recent years, it has been jokingly called "The Village of the Hairdressers", due to over half of the village's inhabitants being hairdressers, mainly aimed at Germans wishing to get a cheap trim.

References

Villages in Gryfino County
Germany–Poland border crossings